Te acuerdas de mí (English title: I've Known You All My Life) is a Mexican telenovela that aired on Las Estrellas from 18 January 2021 to 3 May 2021. The series is produced by Carmen Armendáriz. It is an adaptation of the Turkish series Night Queen, and stars Gabriel Soto and Fátima Molina.

The telenovela is streaming on Vix since 21 July 2022 and has a total of 86 episodes.

Plot 
Pedro Cáceres (Gabriel Soto) is married by convenience to the daughter of his tutor and boss. He decides to end the farce of his marriage when he falls in love with Vera Solís (Fátima Molina), whom he meets during a business trip. But Pedro's father, Olmo Cáceres (Guillermo García Cantú) threatens him to prevent him from breaking up his marriage. Pedro gives in to his boss's threats and abandons Vera. Years later, Pedro will meet Vera again, when she reappears as the girlfriend of his father-in-law.

Cast 
An extensive cast list was published on 4 September 2020 through the People en Español website.
 Gabriel Soto as Pedro Cáceres
 Fátima Molina as Vera Solís
 Guillermo García Cantú as Olmo Cáceres
 Juan Carlos Barreto as Fausto Galicia
 Marisol del Olmo as Ivana Castillo
 Rebecca Jones as Antonia Solís
 Alejandro de la Madrid as Julio
 Ana Bertha Espín as Delia Castro
 Pedro Sicard as Octavio
 Federico Ayos as Gastón Cáceres
 Enoc Leaño as Fuat
 Emilio Guerrero as Granados
 Natalia Téllez as Lola
 Josh Gutiérrez as Teo
 Markin López as Jacinto
 Anton Araiza as Alberto
 Nina Rubín as Faby
 María Penella as Marina Cáceres
 Mauricio Abularach as Gabriel Abadía 
 Tamara Mazarrasa as Mélida
 Cuatli Jiménez as Gonzalo
 Alessio Valentini as Edy
 Moisés Arizmendi as Tomas
 Alejandra Bogue as Gladys
 Joan Santos as Silvio
 Hernan Romo as Tadeo
 Epy Vélez as Emilia
 Tamara Vallarta as Laiza
 Helena Rojo as Alicia Limantour
 Samuel Ledezma as Nico

Production 
The telenovela was presented during the Univision upfront for the 2020–2021 television season. Production of the series began on 14 September 2020 and concluded on 27 March 2021.

Ratings 
 
}}

Episodes

Notes

References

External links 
 

2021 telenovelas
2020s Mexican drama television series
2021 Mexican television series debuts
2021 Mexican television series endings
Televisa telenovelas
Spanish-language telenovelas
Mexican telenovelas
Mexican television series based on Turkish television series
Mexican LGBT-related television shows
2020s LGBT-related drama television series
Non-Turkish television series based on Turkish television series